Enoplosus armatus, commonly referred to as the old wife (plural: old wives), is a species of perciform fish endemic to the temperate coastal waters of Australia. It is the only modern species in the family Enoplosidae.

It has a deep and compressed body and concave forehead. These features are characteristic of typical butterflyfishes. However, the old wife is easily distinguished by its silver-and-black, vertical, zebra-striped coloration, and by its two prominent dorsal fins. The second dorsal fin is very long and sickle-shaped. The fish grows up to 50 cm long.

Its dorsal fins have bony, knife-like spines. These have no obvious venom groove nor gland. Nonetheless, the spines are widely considered to inflict a painful venom.

The name "old wife" refers to the sound it makes when caught, caused by it grinding its teeth. Other vernacular names have included "bastard dory", "zebra-fish" (also used for Girella zebra), and "double scalare". It has a similar range and appearance to the Moonlighter (Tilodon sexfasciatus).

History

The old wife was originally classified in the genus Chaetodon (with the typical butterflyfishes), but it is now classified as the sole modern species of its own family Enoplosidae and genus Enoplosus. Some fossils have also been added to the genus.

The first description of the species, one of the earliest for any Australian fish, was in 1790 by John White in his Journal of a Voyage to New South Wales though some sources give George Shaw (who assisted White in the preparation of his manuscript) as the species authority. White originally named it the long-spined chaetodon (Chætodon armatus) and described it as follows:

The species was reclassified by Lacépède into its own genus (named from "weapon" in Greek to again reflect the long spines), and was moved by Cuvier from Chaetodontidae into its own separate family within Percoidei.

In 1836, Agassiz identified closely related fossils at Monte Bolca (an important fossil site in Europe) as Enoplosus pygopterus (named for its smaller fins). Exceptionally well-preserved fossils show the basic body plan and even the zebra pattern of colouring have not changed significantly over the last 50 million years.

References

External links

 
Taxa named by John White (surgeon)
Fish described in 1790
Extant Danian first appearances